Erlendur Valdimarsson (born 5 November 1947) is an Icelandic athlete. He competed in the men's discus throw at the 1972 Summer Olympics.

References

External links
 

1947 births
Living people
Athletes (track and field) at the 1972 Summer Olympics
Erlendur Valdimarsson
Erlendur Valdimarsson
Place of birth missing (living people)